Anopina is a genus of moths belonging to the subfamily Tortricinae of the family Tortricidae.

Species
Anopina ainslieana Obraztsov, 1962
Anopina albomaculana Brown & Powell, 2000
Anopina albominima Brown & Powell, 2000
Anopina anotera (Walsingham, 1914)
Anopina apicalis Brown & Powell, 2000
Anopina arizonana (Walsingham, 1884)
Anopina asaphes (Walsingham, 1914)
Anopina asuturana Brown & Powell, 2000
Anopina bicolor Brown & Powell, 2000
Anopina bifurcatana Brown & Powell, 2000
Anopina bloomfieldana Brown & Powell, 2000
Anopina bonagotoides Brown & Powell, 2000
Anopina chelatana Brown & Powell, 2000
Anopina chemsaki Brown & Powell, 2000
Anopina chipinquensis Brown & Powell, 2000
Anopina chiricahuae Brown & Powell, 2000
Anopina circumtila Brown & Powell, 2000
Anopina condata Brown & Powell, 2000
Anopina confusa Obraztsov, 1962
Anopina dentata Brown & Powell, 2000
Anopina desmatana (Walsingham, 1914)
Anopina durangoensis Brown & Powell, 2000
Anopina ednana (Kearfott, 1907)
Anopina eleonora Obraztsov, 1962
Anopina glossana Brown & Powell, 2000
Anopina gnathodentana Brown & Powell, 2000
Anopina griseana Brown & Powell, 2000
Anopina guatemalana Brown & Powell, 2000
Anopina guerrerana Obraztsov, 1962
Anopina hermana Brown & Powell, 2000
Anopina hilasma (Walsingham, 1914)
Anopina impotana Brown & Powell, 2000
Anopina incana (Walsingham, 1914)
Anopina internacionana Brown & Powell, 2000
Anopina iturbidensis Brown & Powell, 2000
Anopina macartyana Brown & Powell, 2000
Anopina macrospinana Brown & Powell, 2000
Anopina manantlana Brown & Powell, 2000
Anopina meredithi Brown & Powell, 2000
Anopina metlec Brown & Powell, 2000
Anopina minas Brown & Powell, 2000
Anopina parasema (Walsingham, 1914)
Anopina perplexa Brown & Powell, 2000
Anopina phaeopina Brown & Powell, 2000
Anopina pinana Brown & Powell, 2000
Anopina potosiensis Brown & Powell, 2000
Anopina praecisana (Walsingham, 1914)
Anopina psaeroptera (Razowski & Becker, 1986)
Anopina pseudominas Brown & Powell, 2000
Anopina pseudotilia Brown & Powell, 2000
Anopina quadritiliana Brown & Powell, 2000
Anopina revolcaderos Brown & Powell, 2000
Anopina rusiasana Brown & Powell, 2000
Anopina sacculapinana Brown & Powell, 2000
Anopina salvadorana Brown & Powell, 2000
Anopina scintillans (Walsingham, 1914)
Anopina silvertonana Obraztsov, 1962
Anopina soltera Brown & Powell, 2000
Anopina transtiliana Brown & Powell, 2000
Anopina triangulana (Kearfott, 1908)
Anopina undata (Walsingham, 1914)
Anopina unicana Brown & Powell, 2000
Anopina volcana Brown & Powell, 2000
Anopina wellingi Brown & Powell, 2000
Anopina wrighti Brown & Powell, 2000
Anopina xicotepeca Razowski & Brown, 2004
Anopina yecorana Brown & Powell, 2000
Anopina yolox Brown & Powell, 2000

See also
List of Tortricidae genera

References

 Brown, J. W., 2005: World Catalogue of Insects volume 5 Tortricidae.
 Obraztsov, 1962, American Museum Novitates 2082: 2.

External links
Tortricid.net

 
Euliini
Tortricidae genera